Lukáš Klíma can mean:

Lukáš Klíma (ice hockey) (born 1990), Czech ice hockey player
Lukáš Klíma (curler) (born 1991), Czech curler